The Sun Journal is an American, English language daily newspaper published in New Bern, North Carolina.

History
The newspaper began publishing in 1916 as the Sun Journal following the merger of two older newspapers, the Sun and the Journal, in 1914. It was acquired by the New Bernian newspaper in 1923. In 1974 it was acquired by Freedom Communications, Inc. It was owned by Freedom Communications until 2012, when Freedom sold its Florida and North Carolina papers to Halifax Media Group, which itself was acquired by GateHouse Media in 2015. In 2015, Halifax was acquired by New Media Investment Group.

The Sun Journal has the following lineage:
 Sun Journal (1930present)
 The New Bern Sun journal (1915-1930)
 The New Bernian (1921-1932)
 The New Bern Sun (1912-1915)
 The Daily Journal (1913-1915)
 The Sun (1907-1912)
 The Morning New Bernian (1916-1921)
 New Berne Times, and Republic-courier (1876-18??)
 
The Sun Journal has a daily circulation of 9,000 and a Sunday circulation of 10,500.  It is a broadsheet-format daily (seven days, mornings) with website and Facebook page.

The Sun Journal'' is a member of the North Carolina Press Association.  The current editor is Trevor Dunnell and advertising director is Ken Warren.

In November of 2022 Paxton Media Group acquired the New Bern Sun Journal and five other North Carolina newspapers from Gannett Co., Inc.

See also

 List of newspapers in North Carolina

References

External links
 Official website
 Official mobile site
 Information on Halifax Media Group's corporate site

Sun Journal, The
Sun Journal
New Bern, North Carolina
Daily newspapers published in North Carolina
Gannett publications
1876 establishments in North Carolina